Goodbye Goliath is a detective mystery novel written by American Elliott Chaze, published by Scribner, New York in 1983. It is the first of three novels featuring three recurring characters in a small Southern town: editor Kiel St. James; Crystal Bunt, Kiel's young photographer girlfriend; and Chief of Detectives Orson Boles.

Plot
In a small Alabama town, John Robinson, a disliked general manager of the local paper, The Catherine Call, is found murdered in the news room with a spike through his head. Managing editor Kiel St. James takes it upon himself to solve the crime to help keep the newspaper going.

Reviews
The New York Times said "besides being a traditional, cleverly plotted murder mystery, Goodbye Goliath is an accurate picture of how a small-town newspaper operates. Mr. Chaze, himself a former city editor for a Mississippi paper, knows the ins and outs of the news room. He tells his story with a good deal of sophistication, including some sexual humor that never becomes offensive."

Reviewing Goodbye Goliath, along with two other novels by Chaze, Mr. Yesterday (1984) and Little David (1985), a reviewer for The New Yorker described them as "good, down-home fun with much flavorful redneck talk...plenty of excitement too."

References

Novels by Elliott Chaze
American mystery novels
Detective novels
1983 American novels